Yedigöze can refer to:

 Yedigöze Dam
 Yedigöze, Bayburt
 Yedigöze, Elâzığ
 Yedigöze, İspir